Poland – The Year 1863 (Polish – Polonia – Rok 1863) or The Forging of Poland (Zakuwana Polska) is an early and unfinished oil on canvas painting by Jan Matejko, painted in 1864 in response to his experiences during the January Uprising and now in the Czartoryski Museum in Krakow.

History 
The artist did not find any opportunity to display the work in public and – afraid of repression and fearing for his and his family's safety – he hid it behind the stove in his house. It remained hidden there for several years and later fell into the hands of the Czartoryski family.

Iconography
Poland is represented as a handcuffed young woman in a black dress, torn at the shoulders, with Ruthenia shown to her left as a woman in white ripped violently from her and Lithuania as a partly-naked woman lying in a pool of blood at the bottom left. The work shows Mikhail Muravyov, who had suppressed an uprising in Lithuania, and General Friedrich von Berg, who had suppressed another in the Kingdom of Poland, with Muravyov's sabre touching Lithuania.

In the centre background is a manifesto proclaiming the outbreak of the January Uprising, below the Kingdom of Poland's coat of arms, superimposed on the Russian Imperial coat of arms. The overall scene occurs in a desecrated church full of Russian soldiers dressing up in its liturgical robes and drinking wine from its chalices. On the floor is a tombstone, symbolising the Poles' ancestors, whilst to the right, a group of soldiers supervise a crowd, including a wounded insurgent and a Capuchin monk, probably Poles awaiting exile to Siberia. In the right background, another soldier's bayonet pierces a crucifix on the wall. Right corner Jewish family viewers are waiting for the outcome.

See also
History of Poland
List of Polish painters

References

1864 paintings
19th-century allegorical paintings
Allegorical paintings by Polish artists
Paintings by Jan Matejko
Collection of the Czartoryski Museum